Sociedad Polideportiva Villafranca is a football team based in Villafranca de los Barros, in the autonomous community of Extremadura. Founded in 1949, it plays in Tercera División RFEF – Group 14, holding home matches at the Polideportivo Municipal de Villafranca de los Barros, with a capacity of 5,500 people.

History
Founded in 1949, Villafranca first reached the Tercera División in 1983. Relegated in 1986, the club spent two seasons in the Regional Preferente before returning to the fourth tier in 1988, and went on to spent 20 consecutive seasons in the category.

Season to season

25 seasons in Tercera División
1 season in Tercera División RFEF

References

External links
Soccerway team profile

Football clubs in Extremadura
Association football clubs established in 1949
1949 establishments in Spain